Pisidium amnicum is a species of very small freshwater clam, sometimes known as the greater European peaclam or the River pea shell. It is an aquatic bivalve in the family Sphaeriidae.

Description
Although only 9 mm (range 7–11 mm) in length, this species is considerably larger than most Pisidium species, and has a fairly thick, concentrically ridged shell. Its shell is solid, glossy, triangular-oval in shape, and has broad but not prominent umbos often coated with a dull ferruginous deposit. Its colour is grey-white to brown, often with a greenish cast.

Distribution
Its native distribution is Palearctic. The species has been introduced to northeastern North America.

 Czech Republic – endangered (EN), endangered in Bohemia (EN), critically endangered in Moravia
 Slovakia
 Germany – highly endangered (Stark gefährdet)
 Nordic countries: Denmark, Finland, Iceland, Norway and Sweden (not in the Faroe Islands)
Great Britain and Ireland

Ecology 
In Europe, it requires clean water and high levels of calcium.

References

External links
 Pisidium amnicum at Animalbase taxonomy, biology,status (threats), images

amnicum
Palearctic molluscs
Molluscs described in 1774
Taxa named by Otto Friedrich Müller